Voldemar Peterson (24 April 1908 – 16 April 1976) was an Estonian footballer. He played in 20 matches for the Estonia national football team from 1930 to 1938. He was also named in Estonia's squad for the Group 1 qualification tournament for the 1938 FIFA World Cup.

References

External links
 

1908 births
1976 deaths
Estonian footballers
Estonia international footballers
Place of birth missing
Association football defenders
Tallinna JK players
Footballers from Tallinn
People from the Governorate of Estonia